Albert Syben (born 1 July 1952) is a Belgian former professional boxer who competed from 1977 to 1986. He challenged for the European heavyweight title twice between 1982 and 1983, and held the Belgian heavyweight title twice between 1979 and 1982.

Biography
Albert Syben was born and grew up in Cheratte, Liège, Belgium. He fought for his first title in 1979, facing Rudy Gauwe in Lokeren, his opponent's hometown, in front of 6,000 people. He defeated Gauwe to become the new Belgian heavyweight champion. Syben successfully defended the title against Robert Desnouck on 13 October 1979. On 14 December 1979, he lost his title in a rematch against Gauwe in Brussels.

Syben regained the Belgium heavyweight title by defeating Gauwe in their third bout on 17 April 1981. He later challenged two times for the European heavyweight title, being defeated twice by Lucien Rodriguez, in 1982 and 1983.

On 1 June 1979, Syben faced Muhammad Ali in a 6 round exhibition bout.

Professional boxing record

Exhibition boxing record

References

1952 births
Living people
Belgian male boxers
Sportspeople from Liège
Heavyweight boxers